Woodson may refer to:

 Woodson (name)
 Wilbert Tucker Woodson High School, Fairfax County, Virginia, US
 Woodson Research Center, Houston, Texas, US
 Woodson, an EP by The Get Up Kids

Places in the United States
 Woodson, Arkansas
 Woodson, Illinois
 Woodson, Oregon
 Woodson, Texas
 Woodson Bridge State Recreation Area, California
 Woodson County, Kansas
 Woodson Terrace, Missouri